Henzell is a surname. Notable people with the surname include:

 Marjorie Henzell (born 1948), Australian politician
 Perry Henzell (1936–2006), Jamaican film director